Dercylus cordicollis is a species of beetles in the family Carabidae., native to Ecuador

References

Licininae